Morteza Alviri (born 23 November 1948) is an Iranian politician who served as Mayor of Tehran from 1999 to 2001.

Education
He is a graduate in Electrical Engineering from the Sharif University of Technology in Tehran and has a Master's in Management from the State Management Training Center.

Career
During the regime of Mohammad Reza Pahlavi he was imprisoned for activities with the Fallah organisation.

After the Iranian Revolution he served on the central council of the Islamic Revolutionary Guards. He was affiliated with the leftist faction of the Mojahedin of the Islamic Revolution Organization, and was elected an MP in the Majlis of Iran in 1980 and 1988. He was a close associate of then-speaker Ali Akbar Hashemi Rafsanjani.

Alviri was a supporter of Grand Ayatollah Hossein-Ali Montazeri, who was dismissed as Ayatollah Khomeini's deputy in 1988, and as a result Alviri was prevented from running in the 1992 Majlis elections. Since then he moved from leftist to economically liberal views, and has served in various governmental positions including the Supreme National Security Council's economic committee, the Atomic Energy Organization of Iran, the Ministry of Mines and Metals and was secretary of the Supreme Council for Free Trade Zones during the presidency of Mohammad Khatami and Ali Akbar Hashemi Rafsanjani.

He was unanimously selected as the Mayor of Tehran in June 1999 by the fifteen Tehran City Councillors following the imprisonment of the serving mayor, Gholamhossein Karbaschi, on corruption charges. He is associated with Rafsanjani's Executives of Construction Party. In November 2001, he narrowly avoided impeachment by the council.

In February 2002 he resigned as Mayor, accused of mismanagement by Ebrahim Asgharzadeh. In June 2003 he was appointed as Iran's ambassador to Spain.
 He was replaced by Seyyed Davoud Salehi on 22 June 2006.

Arrest
Mr. Alviri, Karrobi's representative to a committee tasked with investigating post-election crimes, was taken into custody by armed intelligence agents on 8 September 2009.

References

External links 

  Official website of Morteza Alviri

Mayors of Tehran
21st-century Iranian diplomats
Sharif University of Technology alumni
Living people
1948 births
Ambassadors of Iran to Spain
Executives of Construction Party politicians
Members of the 1st Islamic Consultative Assembly
Members of the 3rd Islamic Consultative Assembly
Mojahedin of the Islamic Revolution Organization politicians
Tehran Councillors 2017–
Early People's Mojahedin Organization of Iran members
Imperial Iranian Army conscripted personnel